"This Is a Call" is a song by American rock band Foo Fighters, released as the lead single from the band's 1995 self-titled debut album. Released in 1995, it is one of many songs Dave Grohl wrote and performed on the album when Foo Fighters was a one-man band.

Origins
"This Is a Call" is one of the few songs on the Foo Fighters' debut album that does not date from Dave Grohl's days with Nirvana. It was a new song written in the summer of 1994, months after Kurt Cobain's death. Grohl married his long-time girlfriend Jennifer Youngblood and wrote the song while on honeymoon in Ireland, "In that summer of 1994 I'd travelled a lot; I think I wrote 'This Is A Call' in Ireland. When I got back I booked five days in a recording studio, which seemed like an eternity, and I did the whole first Foo Fighters album in five days".

Release and reception
The song debuted at number 12 on the Modern Rock Tracks chart and quickly rose to a peak of number 2, held off the top by Alanis Morissette's hit "You Oughta Know". The song also charted at number 5 on the UK Singles Chart.

No music video was made for the song: however, the band played the song live on the Late Show with David Letterman toward the end of the summer in 1995. It was the band's first national television performance. Since this performance David Letterman has become an avid fan of the band and Foo Fighters have played on the show 11 times including his last show.

In other media
"This Is a Call" was released as a downloadable content in the 2007 video game series Rock Band on December 23, 2008.

Lyrics
Dave Grohl said about the song: "The chorus says 'This is a call to all my past resignation'. It's just sort of like a little wave to all the people I ever played music with, people I've been friends with, all my relationships, my family. It's a hello, and in a way a thank you."

"'This Is A Call' just seemed like a nice way to open the album, y'know, 'This is a call to all my past resignations...' I felt like I had nothing to lose, and I didn't necessarily want to be the drummer of Nirvana for the rest of my life without Nirvana. I thought I should try something I'd never done before and I'd never stood up in front of a band and been the lead singer, which was fucking horrifying and still is!"

Other versions
A live version recorded on June 15, 1996 at the Golden Gate Park as part of the Tibetan Freedom Concert was released on the "Free Tibet" DVD.
Another version recorded at the following year's version of the festival on June 7, 1997 at the Downing Stadium was released on the Tibetan Freedom Concert live album.

Personnel

Foo Fighters 
 Dave Grohl – guitars, vocals, bass, drums

Singles
7" Vinyl single Stamped Label / French CD single / Japan CD single / 7" single
 "This Is a Call"
 "Winnebago" (Grohl, Turner)

7" One-sided vinyl single / Promo CD
 "This Is a Call"

12" luminous vinyl single / 12" UK vinyl Promo single / UK CD single / Radio promo CD
 "This Is a Call"
 "Winnebago"
 "Podunk"

Cassette tape single / Australian CD single / Dutch CD single
 "This Is a Call"
 "Winnebago"
 "Podunk (Cement Mix)"

 "Podunk (Cement Mix)" is seemingly exactly the same mix and version as the standard version of "Podunk". The reason for this is unknown.

Chart positions

Year-end charts

References

1995 debut singles
Foo Fighters songs
Songs written by Dave Grohl
1994 songs
American power pop songs